Nebria laticollis maritima is a subspecies of ground beetle in the Nebriinae subfamily that is endemic to France.

References

Beetles described in 1976
Endemic beetles of Metropolitan France